Hors de combat is a French term used in diplomacy and international law to refer to persons who are incapable of performing their combat duties during war. Examples include persons parachuting from their disabled aircraft, as well as the sick, wounded, detained, or otherwise disabled. Persons hors de combat are normally granted special protections according to the laws of war, sometimes including prisoner-of-war status, and therefore officially become non-combatants. 

Under the 1949 Geneva Conventions, unlawful combatants hors de combat are granted the same privilege and to be treated with humanity while in captivity but unlike lawful combatants, they are subject to civilian trial and punishment (which may include capital punishment if the detaining power has such a punishment for the crimes they have committed).

Protocol I to the Geneva Conventions defines:

A person is hors de combat if:
 (a) he is in the power of an adverse Party;
 (b) he clearly expresses an intention to surrender; or
 (c) he has been rendered unconscious or is otherwise incapacitated by wounds or sickness, and therefore is incapable of defending himself;
provided that in any of these cases he abstains from any hostile act and does not attempt to escape.

In literature

F. Scott Fitzgerald wrote of Froggy Parker as Amory Blaine flirted with Isabelle in This Side of Paradise: 
Baroness Orczy wrote in her novel The Scarlet Pimpernel: 
Kurt Vonnegut described himself as hors de combat on the title page of his famous anti-war novel, Slaughterhouse Five: 
Jules Verne, in Twenty Thousand Leagues Under the Sea, has Captain Nemo explain: 
Alexandre Dumas's characters in The Three Musketeers several times refer to men wounded as "hors de combat", specifically when describing fights to others as a method of recounting casualties, such as the King Louis XIII of France to the Musketeers after a violent time in the city: 
The safari-hunting author Peter Hathaway Capstick uses the phrase in various contexts in his books The Last Ivory Hunter, Death in the Long Grass, and Death in the Silent Places.
Tom Wolfe in the final chapter of his last novel Back to Blood: 
In William Faulkner's The Mansion the character V.K. Ratliff refers to the episode where Hoake McCarron's arm is broken during a fight with a gang of local boys as "that-ere hors-de-combat creek-bridge evening."

References

International humanitarian law
French words and phrases